Pakch'ŏn County is a kun, or county, in southern North P'yŏngan province, North Korea. It is bordered to the north by T'aech'ŏn, to the east and southeast by Nyŏngbyŏn, and to the west by Unjŏn counties. To the south, it looks across the Ch'ŏngch'ŏn River at Anju city and Mundŏk county in South P'yŏngan province. In 1952, 4 myŏn of Pakch'ŏn were split off to join Unjŏn county; since then, the county's administrative divisions have been revised in 1954, 1956, 1958, 1978, 1980, and 1982.

Geography
Pakch'ŏn's terrain is dominated by rolling hills and plains, with few points exceeding 300 m above sea level. The highest point is Ch'ŏngryongsan (청룡산, 322 m). The Pakch'ŏn Plain spreads over 100 km² along the Taeryong and Ch'ŏngch'ŏn Rivers. Only 30% of the county's terrain is forested, with pine the dominant tree, while 50% is cultivated.

Administrative divisions
Pakch'ŏn county is divided into 1 ŭp (town), 1 rodongjagu (workers' district) and 20 ri (villages):

Climate
The year-round average temperature is 8.8 °C, with temperatures averaging -9.6 °C in January and 23.9 °C in August. The annual rainfall is 1274 mm.

Economy
Pakch'ŏn is a center of rice production; other crops include maize, soybeans, barley, and wheat. Livestock are also raised, and the county leads North Py'ŏngan in the area devoted to orchards. Mineral resources include gold, silver, and mica. In 1991, it was revealed that nuclear facilities are located in Pakch'ŏn.

Transportation
The P'yŏngŭi and Pakch'ŏn lines of the Korean State Railway pass through the county.

Places of interest
The temple of Simwonsa in Sangyang-ri is designated North Korean national treasure 21.

Pakchon is home to Pakchon Technical School (박천전문학교).

See also
Geography of North Korea
Administrative divisions of North Korea
North Pyongan

References

External links

Counties of North Pyongan